Japan competed at the 1988 Winter Paralympics in Innsbruck, Austria. 13 competitors from Japan won two medals including zero gold, zero silver and two bronze and finished 14th in the medal table. All 13 competitors competed in alpine skiing.

Alpine skiing 

The medalists are:

  Tsutomu Mino, Men's Giant Slalom LW1
  Emiko Ikeda, Women's Giant Slalom LW10

See also 

 Japan at the Paralympics
 Japan at the 1988 Winter Olympics

References 

Japan at the Paralympics
1988 in Japanese sport
Nations at the 1988 Winter Paralympics